Yat-Kha is a band from Tuva, led by vocalist/guitarist Albert Kuvezin. Their music is a mixture of Tuvan traditional music and rock, featuring Kuvezin's distinctive kargyraa throat singing style, the kanzat kargyraa.

Biography
Yat-Kha was founded in Moscow in 1991, as a collaborative project between Kuvezin and Russian avant-garde, electronic composer Ivan Sokolovsky. The project blended traditional Tuvan folk music with post-modern rhythms and electronic effects. Kuvezin and Sokolovsky toured and played festivals, and eventually took the name “Yat-Kha,” which refers to a type of small, Central Asian zither similar to the Mongolian yatga and the Chinese guzheng, which Kuvezin plays in addition to the guitar. In 1993, they released a self-titled album on the General Records label.

After the release of Yat-Kha, Kuvezin and Sokolovsky parted creative ways and Kuvezin went on to release five other albums under the name Yat-Kha with other musicians (and less of an emphasis on electronics), beginning with Yenisei Punk in 1995, with morin khuur player Alexei Saaia (produced by Lu Edmonds).  Sokolovsky issued a remastered version of the Yat-Kha album, with additional tracks, under the title Tundra's Ghosts in 1996/97.

Since July 21 2001, they have been performing a live soundtrack to Vsevolod Pudovkin's 1928 silent film Storm Over Asia. They may release a DVD of this version of the film with Reality Film.

In 2010, the project released a new album, Poets and Lighthouses, recorded on the Scottish island of Jura with producer Giles Perring.  It reached Number 1 on the World Music Charts Europe (WMCE) in January 2011.

Discography
Albums:

Priznak Gryadushchei Byedy (1991)
Khanparty (1992)
Yat-Kha (1993)
Yenisei Punk (1995)
Tundra's Ghosts (1996/97) - remastered version of Yat-Kha released by Ivan Sokolovsky)
Dalai Beldiri (1999)
Aldyn Dashka (2000)
Bootleg (2001, live)
tuva.rock (2003)
Re-Covers (2005)
Bootleg 2005 (2005, live)
Poets and Lighthouses (2010)

Members

Current 
 Albert Kuvezin (vocals, Throat singing, Guitar, Bass guitar, Chanzy, Khomus, Yat-Kha)
 Sholban Mongush (igil, vocal)
 "Theodore Scipio" (Bass guitar)

Past
 Evgeny "Zhenya" Tkachov (drums, Percussion)
 Radik Tiuliush (vocals, Throat Singing, Morin Khuur, Igil)
 Sailyk Ommun (vocals, Yat-Kha)
 Makhmud Skripaltschchikov (Bass guitar)
 Aldyn-ool Sevek (vocals, Throat singing, Morin Khuur, Igil)
 Alexei Saaia (vocals, Morin khuur, Bass guitar)
 Ivan Sokolovsky (Synthesizers, Percussion)

Appearing on Poets and Lighthouses with Albert Kuvezin (Voice, Acoustic Guitar)
 Simon Edwards (Acoustic Bass guitar, Double Bass, Marimbula, Mbira, Appalachian Dulcimer)
 Giles Perring (Acoustic Guitar, Piano, Harmonium, Backing Vocals, Drums, Percussion)
 Sarah Homer (Clarinet, Bass Clarinet, Recorder)
 Melanie Pappenheim (Backing Vocals)
 Lu Edmonds (Cumbus)
 Neil Cameron (Scottish Small Pipes)

Awards 
 1991 recognized by Brian Eno, one of the international judges at the first Voices of Asia Festival in Almaty, Kazakhstan
 1995 French RFI "Decouvertes Est" prize for Yenisei Punk
 1999 German Critic's Prize for Dalai Beldiri
 2002 BBC Radio 3 "Award for World Music"

External links 
Official Russian site
 
 
Ivan Sokolovsky
Reality Film: Storm over Asia

References 

Throat singing
Tuvan throat singing
Russian rock music groups
Musical groups from Tuva
Musical groups established in 1991
Russian electronic music groups
1991 establishments in Russia